
Gmina Rachanie is a rural gmina (administrative district) in Tomaszów Lubelski County, Lublin Voivodeship, in eastern Poland.

Villages
Gmina Rachanie contains the villages and settlements of Falków, Grodysławice, Grodysławice-Kolonia, Józefówka, Kociuba, Kozia Wola, Michalów, Michalów-Kolonia, Pawłówka, Rachanie, Rachanie-Kolonia, Siemierz, Siemnice, Werechanie, Werechanie-Kolonia, Wożuczyn, Wożuczyn-Cukrownia, Zwiartówek and Zwiartówek-Kolonia.

Neighbouring gminas
Gmina Rachanie is bordered by the gminas of Jarczów, Komarów-Osada, Krynice, Łaszczów, Tarnawatka, Tomaszów Lubelski and Tyszowce.

References

Polish official population figures 2006

Rachanie
Tomaszów Lubelski County